Aligarh is a 2015 Indian biographical drama film directed by Hansal Mehta and written by Apurva Asrani. It stars Manoj Bajpayee and Rajkummar Rao in the lead roles.

The film had its world premiere at the 20th Busan International Film Festival, receiving a standing ovation. The film was released worldwide on 26 February 2016 to critical acclaim. Bajpayee won critical acclaim and a Filmfare Critics Award for Best Actor for his portrayal of Ramchandra Siras.

Plot
Set in the city of Aligarh, Uttar Pradesh, it is the true story of Ramchandra Siras, a professor of Marathi and the head of the Classical Modern Indian Languages Faculty at the famed Aligarh Muslim University, who was suspended on grounds of morality. He was also sacked from his position of Reader and Chair of Modern Indian Languages. The film starts at the moment when the professor's privacy is invaded by a film crew from a local TV station who forcibly enter his house and film him having sex with a male rickshaw-puller. Siras is forced to leave his housing at the university and is suspended from his job. He is contacted by a journalist who is sympathetic to him, and his case is taken up in court. The court rules in his favor and Siras' suspension is revoked, but before he can return to work,
he is found dead.

Cast
 Manoj Bajpayee as Prof. Ramchandra Siras
 Rajkummar Rao as Journalist Deepu Sebastian
 Ashish Vidyarthi as Advocate Anand Grover
 Ishwak Singh as Arvind Narayan
 Nutan Surya as Anjali Gopalan
 Divya Unny as Reporter
 Suman Vaidya as Shadab Qureshi
 Devyansh Agnihotri (Child Artist)
 Saptrishi Ghosh as Assistant Lawyer
 Dilnaz Irani as Nameeta
 Sukhesh Arora as Tahir Islam
 Sumit Gulati as Tashi
 Sachin Parikh as Anuj
 Balaji Gauri as Nita Grewal
 K.R.Parmeshwar as Prof. Sridharan
 Prashant Kumar as Rickshaw wala

Production
The film was shot in various parts of Uttar Pradesh including Aligarh, Gorakhpur, Agra, Bareilly and Greater Noida (C-Block; Sector – Gamma 1). Wherein Greater Noida a small indoor sequence was shot for 3–4 days by Rajkumar Rao.

Reception
Aligarh had its European première at the 59th BFI London Film Festival on 10 October 2015. The response was generally superlative and the film garnered excellent reviews. Screen International in its review called it a "A subtle, sensitive take on a controversial real-life court case involving the victimization of a gay college professor, Aligarh underscores the growing strength and diversity of Indian independent cinema".

The British Film Institute, in its 'Whats On' review of Aligarh called it "Probably the best film yet on the Indian gay male experience, Hansal Mehta directs a riveting and nuanced tale that is as touching as it is powerful." Aligarh had its India première in Mumbai at the 17th Jio MAMI Mumbai Film Festival on 30 October 2015. It also has the honour of being the only Indian film to open the festival since its inception. The response was once again overwhelming. Meenakshi Shedde, South Asia Consultant to the Berlin Film Festival and award-winning critic, had this to say about in her Mid-Day review: "Aligarh is masterfully directed: it is that rare film that courageously stands for human rights, including those of homosexuals, yet offers a quiet, distilled perspective." Columnist Aseem Chhabra in his rediff.com review said "Aligarh is a very important film, a milestone in the history of Indian cinema that should start the much-needed conversation about how India treats a visible and yet often ignored minority group."

Gay rights activist and editor of Bombay Dost magazine, Ashok Row Kavi, in his Firstpost.com review called Aligarh "a masterpiece of cinematic skills" and went on to say "What Mehta and writer Apurva Asrani have done is pluck out a commonplace professor in a commonplace university and weave a true life story into a tapestry of terrifying, compelling drama." Indian Express gave 3.5 rating out of 5.

Accolades

See also 
 Philadelphia, a film about a gay man being terminated from his law firm and his fight for compensation

References

External links

2010s Hindi-language films
Indian biographical drama films
Indian LGBT-related films
LGBT-related films based on actual events
2015 films
2015 biographical drama films
2015 LGBT-related films
Films set in Uttar Pradesh
Films shot in Uttar Pradesh
Films about social issues in India
LGBT-related drama films
Gay-related films
2015 drama films
Aligarh
Aligarh Muslim University